Fútbol Consultants Desamparados is a Costa Rican soccer team that plays in the Liga de Ascenso, the second national category.

History

Fútbol Consultants Moravia

It was founded on May 3, 2017 in the canton of Moravia in the province of San José, under the official name of Soccer Consultants Moravia, after businessman José Luis Rodríguez acquired the franchise of Jacó Rays Fútbol Club, once this last team could not cope with the financial problems it had since 2014.

In its beginnings, the club was considered a kind of successor to the Moravian Sports Union, since the canton went for several years without having a soccer club in the second category, despite having a stadium that meets the minimum requirements. necessary.  Previously, the structure of Fútbol Consultants existed as a team of minor divisions and women's category.

It is fundamentally sponsored by the transnational company that gives it its name, Futbol Consultants, a sports academy dedicated to training, university scholarships in the United States and the sale of soccer players.

The first coach of the club is former soccer player Robert Arias and they debuted in the 2017 Opening Tournament.

Fútbol Consultants Desamparados

In September 2018, once the Opening Tournament of the Second Division of that year began, the franchise moved to the canton of Desamparados, due to the lack of logistical support from the Municipality of Moravia and sponsors from that community, added to the scarce fans and the poor conditions of the "Pipilo" Umaña stadium.

From then on, and thanks to the agreement signed between the president of the team and the mayor of the canton at that time, the club was renamed Futbol Consultants Desamparados, and its home venue is the Jorge Hernán "Cuty" Monge stadium. included the change of colors in the shield and in the uniform (instead of red, it is blue).

Stadium

Its home venue is the Jorge Hernán "Cuty" Monge Stadium, located in the José Figueres Ferrer Olympic Village of Forsaken.

It has capacity for 5,500 fans, an artificial field and lighting for night games.

Current squad
As of January 9, 2023

References

Football clubs in Costa Rica